The Department of Commerce Bronze Medal is the third of three honor awards of the United States Department of Commerce. Since 1949, the Bronze Medal is the highest award presented by the head or secretarial officer of an operating unit of the Department of Commerce such as the NOAA, NIST, NWS, etc. for superior performance. The award may be presented to an individual, group (or team), or organization for outstanding or significant contributions which have increased the efficiency and effectiveness of the operating unit of the Department of Commerce. 

The annual operating unit Bronze Medal Awards ceremony in the Washington D.C. area is scheduled by the operating unit sometime after the annual Department of Commerce Gold and Silver Medal Awards ceremony. An Individual and members of a group (or team) which is awarded the Bronze Medal Award are each presented a framed certificate and medal. An organization receiving the award is presented one framed certificate and medal.

Award criteria 
The bureaus of the Department of Commerce are prohibited from automatically granting a Bronze Medal to an individual, group (or team), or organization not recommended for a Gold or Silver Medal.

The Bronze Medal Award ceremony must be held following the Secretary of Commerce Honor Awards ceremony to ensure that nominees not approved for Gold or Silver Medals have the opportunity to be fully considered for a Bronze Medal.

To warrant a Bronze Medal, a contribution must focus on qualitative and quantitative performance measures reflected in the Department of Commerce's strategic plan and be identified in one of the following areas:

 Leadership
 Personal and professional excellence
 Scientific/engineering achievement
 Organizational development
 Customer service
 Administrative/technical support or
 Heroism

NOAA Corps recipients 
The Bronze Medal program is managed by the National Oceanic Atmospheric Administration (NOAA) with oversight by the Department of Commerce.

The Bronze Medal is the highest honorary award of the NOAA presented by the Under Secretary of Commerce for Oceans and Atmosphere. The award is given to an individual or group for significant contributions to the NOAA. Bronze Medals are automatically awarded at the NOAA level to individuals and groups that were submitted but not approved for a Department of Commerce Gold Medal or Silver Medal unless the nominating line of staff office chooses to withdraw the nomination.

Contributions must meet one or more of the following criteria:
 Accomplishment of improvements in management systems that are more effective or more efficient;
 Demonstration of unusual or creative ability in the development and improvement of methods and procedures;
 Significant contribution affecting major programs or a scientific accomplishment or;
Superior accomplishment of assigned tasks for at least five consecutive years.

NOAA awardees of the Bronze Medal Award are presented a medallion and NOAA Commissioned Corps awardees are presented a full sized military style medal, miniature medal, and a full and miniature size service ribbon provided from the Commissioned Personnel Center. Group or organizational recipients of the medal are authorized to wear a silver  inch "O" device on the full size medal's suspension ribbon and service ribbon. Each additional award of the Bronze Medal is denoted by a  inch gold star for the full size medal suspension ribbon and service ribbon and a  inch gold star for the miniature medal suspension ribbon.

Individual and group members also receive a personalized engraved plaque signed by the Under Secretary for Oceans and Atmosphere. Members of an organization awarded the Bronze Medal each receive the award and the organization receives one engraved plaque to represent the entire organization.

Notable recipients
 Richard R. Behn
 Gerd F. Glang
 Mary Gibbons Natrella
 Harley D. Nygren
 David A. Score, 2 awards
 Phyllis T. Johnson
 Fady K. Mirhom

References

Awards and decorations of the United States Department of Commerce